Dungaree or dungarees may refer to:

 Dungaree (fabric), similar to denim
 Jeans, denim trousers (mainly US)
 Overalls (mainly UK and Commonwealth)
 A U.S. Navy working uniform

See also
 
 Dungaree